Hughes Road is an arterial road in South Mumbai linking Opera House with Kemps Corner. It is flanked by Hanging Gardens of Mumbai and the Towers of Silence on one side and the Porsche showroom, Augustus Villa 21 Hughes road, New Era School, RTI and Westside on the other. It is close to the Arabian Sea with Navi Mumbai, Uran, and Mira-Bhayandar being nearby cities.

	
Places in Hughes Road

{widget:url=https://www.google.com/maps/place/Hughes+Rd,+Mumbai,+Maharashtra,+India/@18.961113,72.8097727,1952m/data=!3m1!1e3!4m2!3m1!1s0x3be7ce0b9e4666b7:0x816872327f332dc7}

Future Development

Future projects include the creation of two towers that will be used for commercial and residential purposes.

Related Reading

External Links

References

References

Streets in Mumbai